Jurinea is a genus of plants in the family Asteraceae.

The species are native to Europe, Asia, and northwestern Africa.

 Species

References

Bibliography

External links

Asteraceae genera
Cynareae